David Lord Paterson (born 1966) is an American screenwriter, actor and producer. He is in heavy demand as a public speaker, serves on several film festival advisory boards (including the Savannah Film Festival and Big Apple Film Festival), and has had his films in over a hundred film festivals throughout the world. His studio releases have been seen by tens of millions throughout the world.

When Paterson was a boy, his best friend, an eight-year-old girl named Lisa Hill, was struck by lightning and killed.  His mother, author Katherine Paterson, used this real-life experience as the basis for her children's novel Bridge to Terabithia. David Paterson produced and co-wrote the screenplay for the film adaptation of the novel released in 2007. The film was one of the highest-grossing films of 2007 and helped launch the careers of Josh Hutcherson, Anna Sophia Robb and Bailee Madison.

He graduated from The Catholic University of America in 1989 with a BA. Paterson held a special advance screening of Bridge to Terabithia on February 1, 2007, for members of the CUA community at the AFI Silver Theatre in Silver Spring, Maryland. David and Lisa Hill grew up in the next town, Takoma Park, Md.

As a playwright Paterson has published over one dozen titles with Samuel French, Inc. He holds the record for being the only playwright ever to have three plays premiere on New York stages within one month.

In December 2012, Paterson ran a write-in campaign for Park District Commissioner of Manhasset, and won against the Incumbent. David was reelected on December 9, 2015, for another 3-year term.

In the Fall of 2016, his feature film, The Great Gilly Hopkins, based on another book written by his mother, opened in US theaters. The film starred Kathy Bates, Glenn Close, Octavia Spencer, Julia Stiles, Bill Cobbs, Sophie Nélisse, Billy Magnussen, and Toby Turner.

References

External links
Official homepage Retrieved 12 Feb 2007.

Election Results Retrieved January 6, 2013.

1966 births
Living people
American male screenwriters
Catholic University of America alumni
Date of birth missing (living people)
Place of birth missing (living people)
American male dramatists and playwrights
21st-century American dramatists and playwrights
21st-century American male writers
21st-century American screenwriters